Anopliomorpha is a genus of beetles in the family Cerambycidae, containing the following species:

 Anopliomorpha antennata Chemsak & Noguera, 1993
 Anopliomorpha antillarum (Fisher, 1932)
 Anopliomorpha gracilis Chemsak & Noguera, 1993
 Anopliomorpha hirsutum (Linsley, 1935)
 Anopliomorpha reticolle (Bates, 1885)
 Anopliomorpha rinconium (Casey, 1924)

References

Elaphidiini